Gentianopsis is a genus of flowering plants in the gentian family known commonly as fringed gentians. These are similar to the gentians of genus Gentiana. Most have flowers which are blue to purple in color. They may be annual or perennial. They are native to Eurasia and temperate North America.

Species include:
Gentianopsis barbellata - perennial fringed gentian
Gentianopsis ciliata - fringe-flowered gentian
Gentianopsis crinita - greater fringed gentian
Gentianopsis detonsa - windmill fringed gentian
Gentianopsis holopetala - Sierra fringed gentian
Gentianopsis macounii - Macoun's fringed gentian
Gentianopsis macrantha - grand fringed gentian
Gentianopsis simplex - oneflower fringed gentian
Gentianopsis thermalis - Rocky Mountain fringed gentian
Gentianopsis virgata - lesser fringed gentian
Gentianopsis bivigaliaie - Appalachian fringed gentian

External links
Jepson Manual Treatment

 
Flora of North America
Gentianaceae genera